This article lists various water polo records and statistics in relation to the China women's national water polo team at the Summer Olympics.

The China women's national water polo team has participated in 3 of 5 official women's water polo tournaments.

Abbreviations

Team statistics

Comprehensive results by tournament
Note: Results of Olympic qualification tournaments are not included. Last updated: 5 May 2021.

Legend
  – Champions
  – Runners-up
  – Third place
  – Fourth place
  – Qualified for forthcoming tournament
  – Hosts

Number of appearances
Last updated: 5 May 2021.

Legend
 Year* – As host team

Best finishes
Last updated: 5 May 2021.

Legend
 Year* – As host team

Finishes in the top four
Last updated: 5 May 2021.

Legend
 Year* – As host team

Medal table
Last updated: 5 May 2021.

Player statistics

Multiple appearances

The following table is pre-sorted by number of Olympic appearances (in descending order), year of the last Olympic appearance (in ascending order), year of the first Olympic appearance (in ascending order), date of birth (in ascending order), name of the player (in ascending order), respectively.

Top goalscorers

The following table is pre-sorted by number of total goals (in descending order), year of the last Olympic appearance (in ascending order), year of the first Olympic appearance (in ascending order), name of the player (in ascending order), respectively.

Goalkeepers

The following table is pre-sorted by edition of the Olympics (in ascending order), cap number or name of the goalkeeper (in ascending order), respectively.

Last updated: 1 April 2021.

Legend and abbreviation
  – Hosts
 Eff % – Save efficiency (Saves / Shots)

Source:
 Official Results Books (PDF): 2008 (pp. 59–60), 2012 (pp. 350–351), 2016 (pp. 203–204).

Top sprinters
The following table is pre-sorted by number of total sprints won (in descending order), year of the last Olympic appearance (in ascending order), year of the first Olympic appearance (in ascending order), name of the sprinter (in ascending order), respectively.

* Number of sprinters (30+ sprints won): 1
 Number of sprinters (20–29 sprints won): 0
 Number of sprinters (10–19 sprints won): 0
 Number of sprinters (5–9 sprints won): 1
 Last updated: 15 May 2021.

Legend and abbreviation
  – Hosts
 Eff % – Efficiency (Sprints won / Sprints contested)

Source:
 Official Results Books (PDF): 2008 (pp. 59–60), 2012 (pp. 350–351), 2016 (pp. 203–204).

See also
 List of women's Olympic water polo tournament records and statistics
 Lists of Olympic water polo records and statistics
 China at the Olympics

References

Sources

ISHOF

External links
 Olympic water polo – Official website

.Olympics, Women
Olympic water polo team records and statistics